The Ward House is a house on Capitol Hill in Seattle, Washington, USA. Having been built in 1882, it is one of the oldest houses in Seattle. Existing houses reportedly built before 1882 in Seattle include the 2629 East Aloha Street (1881), 727 28th Avenue (1870) and Maynard's House located at 3045 64th Avenue Southwest (approximately 1860 ± 2 years).

The building, originally at 1427 Boren Avenue, was designed, built and originally owned by George W. Ward. In 1962, the architect Victor Steinbrueck wrote of it, "…this fanciful example of residential Victorian carpenter Gothic, one of the most interesting and apparently sound of the rare few remaining… could be made delightfully attractive by sympathetic preservation…"

Nonetheless, it became vacant in 1974 and was scheduled for demolition in the mid-1980s. The owners, Dr. and Mrs. Michael Buckley, donated the structure to Historic Seattle, a nonprofit architectural preservation organization chartered as a public development authority by the city. Historic Seattle in turn sold it to David Leen, a local lawyer, for $7,500. On April 6, 1986, Leen moved the Ward House from its First Hill lot on Boren Avenue between Union and Pike Streets to its current location at the corner of E. Denny Way and Belmont Avenue E. Leen worked to restore the building using fixtures and furniture from the original time period. The building was occupied by Leen's law office, as well as several other solo practices, until 2016. It is now owned and occupied by Tola Capital, LLC.

Besides being listed on the National Register of Historic Places, the building is also an official City of Seattle landmark.

See also
List of the oldest buildings in Washington (state)

Notes

External links
George W Ward Biography http://archive.org/stream/volumeofmemoirsg00lewi#page/286/mode/2up
Historic Seattle's Ward House page
"Seattle's Oldest House Gets a New Home", Historic Preservation magazine (link not working)
Robert Ketcherside, CHS Re:Take | Onward for the Ward House, Capitol Hill Seattle Blog.

1880s architecture in the United States
1882 establishments in Washington Territory
Capitol Hill, Seattle
History of Seattle
Houses in Seattle
Houses on the National Register of Historic Places in Washington (state)
National Register of Historic Places in Seattle
Relocated buildings and structures in Washington (state)
Victorian architecture in Washington (state)